Columbia Historic District is a national historic district located at Columbia, Tyrrell County, North Carolina.  It encompasses 119 contributing buildings, 1 contributing structure, and 1 contributing object in the central business district and surrounding residential sections of Columbia.  The district developed between about 1880 and 1944 and includes examples of a variety of popular architecture styles. Located in the district is the separately listed Tyrrell County Courthouse.  Other notable buildings include Snell's Inn (c. 1910), Columbia Garage (c. 1930), Columbia Christian Church (c. 1905), McClees-Coffield House (c. 1880), Combs-Hussey House (c. 1900), Frederick L. W. Cohoon House (c. 1904), Columbia Baptist Church (1905), W. J. White Building (1931-1932), Columbian Theatre (c. 1935), Wesley United Methodist Church (1912), St. Andrews Episcopal Church (1909), Tyrrell County Jail (c. 1910), Merchants and Farmers Bank / East Carolina Bank (c. 1905), Tyrrell County Bank (c. 1930), and Columbia Theatre (c. 1900).

It was listed on the National Register of Historic Places in 1994.

References

Historic districts on the National Register of Historic Places in North Carolina
Buildings and structures in Tyrrell County, North Carolina
National Register of Historic Places in Tyrrell County, North Carolina
Houses in Tyrrell County, North Carolina